K196 or K-196 may refer to:

K-196 (Kansas highway), state highway in Kansas
Symphony, K. 196+121 (Mozart)